Amphidromus poecilochrous is a species of air-breathing land snail, a terrestrial pulmonate gastropod mollusk in the family Camaenidae.

Distribution 
Sumbawa Island

References

External links 

poecilochrous
Gastropods described in 1896